Shyamnagar is an upazila of Satkhira District in the Division of Khulna, Bangladesh. It is the biggest upazila of Bangladesh. It is close to the Sundarbans.

Geography 
It has 46,592 households and a total area of 1968.24 km2.

Shyamnagar Upazila is bordered by Kaliganj (Satkhira) and Assasuni upazilas to the north, the Sundarbans and Bay of Bengal to the south, Koyra and Assasuni upazilas to the east and the Indian state of West Bengal to the west. The main rivers here are: Raymangal, Kalindi, Kobadak, Kholpetua, Arpangachhia, Malancha, Hariabhanga and Chuna. South Talpatti Island at the estuary of the Hariabhanga is notable.

Shyamnagar town consists of 5 mouzas and 13 villages. The area of the town is 10.76 km2. The town has a population of 11,021; 52.36% male and 47.64% female. The population density is 1024 per km2. Literacy rate among the town people is 37.3%. The town has three dakbungalows and a BDR Headquarters.

The average literacy in the entire upazila is 28.1%, comprising 38% among males and 17.4% among females. There are five colleges, 28 high schools, 98 madrasas and 96 government primary schools. The main occupation of the people is agriculture, 32.93% of whom are engaged with this work. The main exports are Paddy, jute and shrimp. Shyamnagar is the largest thana of Bangladesh.

Demographics 
According to the 2011 Bangladesh census, Shyamnagar had a population of 318,254. Males constituted 48.21% of the population and females 51.79%. Muslims formed 79.35% of the population, Hindus 20.37%, Christians 0.01% and others 0.25%. Shyamnagar had a literacy rate of 48.62% for the population 7 years and above.

As of the 1991 Bangladesh census, Shyamnagar has a population of 265004. Males constitute 50.46% of the population, and females 49.54%. This Upazila's eighteen up population is 132516. Shyamnagar has an average literacy rate of 28.2% (7+ years), and the national average of 32.4% literate.

Administration
Shyamnagar Thana was turned into an upazila in 1982.

Shyamnagar Upazila is divided into Shyamnagar Municipality and 12 union parishads: Atulia, Bhurulia, Burigoalini, Gabura, Ishwaripur, Kaikhali, Kashimari, Munshiganj, Nurnagar, Padmapukur, Ramjannagar, and Shyamnagar. The union parishads are subdivided into 127 mauzas and 218 villages.

See also
Upazilas of Bangladesh
Districts of Bangladesh
Divisions of Bangladesh

References

External links 
 

Shyamnagar Upazila
Upazilas of Satkhira District
Khulna Division